Hello Crazy World is a 2003 album by South African rock band Prime Circle. A two-disc special edition of the album was released later that year. The album spawned hits such as "Hello", "Same Goes For You", "Let Me Go", and "My Inspiration".

Track listing

 "Same Goes For You" – 4:15
 "Hello" – 3:40
 "As Long As I Am Here" – 3:29
 "Crazy World" – 3:44
 "Inside Out" – 3:56
 "Standing" – 2:48
 "Father" – 3:09
 "Shed My Skin" – 3:32
 "My Inspiration" – 2:47
 "Nice To Know You" – 3:20
 "In My Head" – 3:12
 "Lose tomorrow" – 2:58
 "Let Me Go" – 4:14
 "Weaker Still" – 3:23

Disc 2 Special Edition Tracks 
 "Daydreamer (What Are You On)" – 3:46
 "Same Goes For You (Acoustic Mix)" – 4:10
 "Hello (Acoustic Mix)" – 3:54
 "Let Me Go (Acoustic Mix)" – 4:11
 "My Inspiration (Acoustic Mix)" – 2:56

Prime Circle albums
2003 albums